Marrickville Council was a local government area located in the Inner West region of Sydney, Australia. It was originally created on 1 November 1861 as the "Municipality of Marrickville". On 12 May 2016, Marrickville Council was forcibly merged with Ashfield and Leichhardt councils into the newly formed Inner West Council.

The area was bounded by Leichhardt to the north, the City of Sydney to the east and north-east, the City of Botany Bay to the south-east, Rockdale to the south, Canterbury to the west, and Ashfield to the north-west. The area is roughly bounded by Parramatta Road to the north, King Street and the Princes Highway to the east, the Cooks River and Alexandra Canal to the south, and New and Old Canterbury Roads to the west.

While the area's background was traditionally working-class, which made the area a stronghold for the Australian Labor Party, several waves of immigration and a continuing trend of gentrification substantially influenced the demographics and character of the area, increasing the number of independents and Greens on the Council. The last Mayor of Marrickville Council was Cr. Sam Iskandar of the Labor Party.

In December 2021, a majority of voters in Inner West Council voted in favour of reversing the 2016 merger and separating the three pre-existing councils of Ashfield, Leichhardt and Marrickville.

Suburbs and localities

The suburbs and localities within the former Marrickville Council area were:

History
Based on artefacts found near the Cooks River and Alexandra Canal, it is believed that the area has been occupied for at least 7,000 years. The area was originally occupied by the Cadigal clan of the Darug people who spoke the Eora language. Their name for most of the present day local government area was Bullanaming.

European settlement of the area began very soon after the arrival of the First Fleet in 1788. The first land grant was made in 1789, and by 1809 all the land had been granted. In the 1830s, the district consisted of five large estates, including Thomas Chalder's estate named Marrick after his home town in North Yorkshire. At this point, the area was still quite rural in nature.

Following the subdivision of these estates, municipalities were formed in Marrickville (1 November 1861), Camperdown (1862), Newtown (1862), St Peters (1871) and Petersham (1872). The first Marrickville council, consisting of six councillors elected proportionately, was elected on 9 December 1861 at the Stanmore Hotel.

The population of the inner west increased greatly from the beginning of the 20th century, peaking at roughly 113,000 in 1948. It was in this year that the State Government introduced the Local Government (Areas) Act 1948, and Marrickville Municipal Council was enlarged by merging with St Peters and Petersham on 1 January 1949. The Camperdown and Newtown municipalities had already been merged with the City of Sydney, however in 1968 a boundary readjustment added parts of these areas to Marrickville.

The area's background was traditionally working-class, making Marrickville Council a stronghold for the Australian Labor Party, and Labor Party ructions often affected the politics of the Council itself. In the 1980s, a toxic culture in inner-city party branches and inter-factional disturbances, which led to the assault of NSW Legislative Council member, Peter Baldwin, at his house in Marrickville, affected Marrickville Council most particularly, with a party committee recommending its dismissal in July 1980.

Although initially opposed as an extreme act, particularly by Minister for Local Government, Lin Gordon, when five Labor aldermen, Barry Jones, Margaret Newman, Jack Passaris, Ken Brennan and Grahame Watson, resigned from the Council in December 1982, alleging that they had been "bashed out of office" and detailing "five years of threats and intimidation" (Newman and Brennan had both been assaulted in their own homes days before), Gordon finally took action. On 14 December 1982, Gordon dismissed Marrickville Council and appointed the former Shire Clerk of Gunnedah and Walgett, Alexander Trevallion as Administrator. Council remained under administration, which included debates over an amalgamation with Leichhardt Municipality, until elections were held on 22 September 1984.

Israel boycott
On 14 December 2010, Greens councillor Cathy Peters moved a motion to support the international Boycott, Divestment and Sanctions against Israel. This motion was supported by Greens, Labor and one independent councillor, including the Mayor at the time, Fiona Byrne. The motion was widely condemned by politicians from both sides of politics including Foreign Minister Kevin Rudd, then Premier Kristina Keneally and federal Greens leader, Bob Brown. The move received support from Nobel Peace Prize Laureates Archbishop Desmond Tutu and Mairead Maguire. On 14 April 2011, it was revealed that the boycott would cost Marrickville ratepayers 3.4 million if implemented. The boycott also meant the council would have to replace goods from companies such as Hewlett Packard, Holden, Volvo and Motorola amongst others.

New South Wales Liberal Premier Barry O'Farrell threatened to use his powers under the Local Government Act to sack the council if it did not rescind its resolution for the boycott. At a council meeting on 19 April 2011, members of the community were invited to express their opinions, and after a three hour debate the motion was rescinded. Byrne did not seek re-election, and in September 2011, Morris Hanna became the new mayor after Labor supported his candidacy and his name was pulled out of the hat in the tie breaker. He is an independent who fought against the BDS campaign.

Amalgamation
The merger was implemented on 12 May 2016.

Demographics 
At the 2011 Census, there were  people in the Marrickville local government area, of these 49.5% were male and 50.5% were female. Aboriginal and Torres Strait Islander people made up 1.5% of the population. The median age of people in the Marrickville Council area was 36 years. Children aged 0 – 14 years made up 14.7% of the population and people aged 65 years and over made up 10.4% of the population. Of people in the area aged 15 years and over, 35.1% were married and 10.9% were either divorced or separated.

Population in the Marrickville Council area between the 2001 Census and the 2006 Census decreased by 0.99% and in the subsequent five years to the 2011 Census, population growth was 6.53%. When compared with total population growth of Australia for the same periods, being 5.78% and 8.32% respectively, population growth in the Marrickville local government area was lower than the national average. The median weekly income for residents within the Manly Council area was higher than the national average.

Compared to the national average, at the 2011 Census, Marrickville Council area had a high proportion of households (34.1%) where two or more languages are spoken (national average was 20.4%); and a low proportion (62.3%) where English only was spoken at home (national average was 76.8%).

Council

Final composition and election method
Marrickville Municipal Council was composed of twelve Councillors elected proportionally as four separate wards, each electing three Councillors. All Councillors were elected for a fixed four-year term of office, while the Mayor and Deputy Mayor being elected by the Councillors at the first meeting of the Council. The last election was held on 8 September 2012, and the makeup of the Council after that election was as follows:

Mayors

Notable councillors
John Adamson, Alderman 1944–1948, MP for Concord  1950–1953.
Sylvia Hale, Councillor 1995–2004, Greens MLC 2003–2010.
Leo McLeay, Alderman 1971–1977, MHR for Grayndler 1979–1993, MHR for Watson 1993–2004, Speaker of the House of Representatives 1989–1993.
Penny Sharpe, Councillor 2004–2008, MLC 2005–present
Sir Bertram Stevens, Alderman 1925–1927, Premier 1932–1939.
Carmel Tebbutt, Councillor 1993–1998, Deputy Mayor 1995–1998, MP for Marrickville 2005–2015, Deputy Premier of NSW 2008–2011.

Housing
The suburbs within the Marrickville area are generally characterised by Victorian-era terraces, semi-detached houses and other varieties of urban federation housing. These houses gained popularity among renovators as the suburbs became gentrified in the late 20th century. Detached housing, wider streets and larger blocks of land are more common in the suburbs further from the city, such as Dulwich Hill and parts of Marrickville.

Several medium density apartment blocks were constructed in the area in the 1960s and 1970s. Since the 1980s, modern infill development has tended to be sympathetic with traditional streetscapes.

Parks

The Marrickville area has 88 parks and reserves of various sizes within its boundaries. Major sporting grounds include Henson Park, home of the Newtown Jets rugby league club, and Petersham Park, where Sir Donald Bradman scored his first century in grade cricket.

Tempe Lands, 10 hectares of parkland at the south-western corner of LGA, was redeveloped by Marrickville Council in 2003 on the site of a former rubbish tip at a cost of A$17.5 million. The parklands feature sporting fields, a golf driving range, and a constructed saltmarsh and ephemeral wetlands area for wildlife.

Other major parks in the area include Enmore Park, Camperdown Park, Marrickville Park, Steel Park and Camperdown Memorial Rest Park. There are also substantial parklands surrounding the Cooks River. After the completion of the airport's third runway in the mid-1990s, the Commonwealth Government controversially purchased and demolished 152 residential properties in the worst-affected parts of Sydenham. The newly vacant land, which is located not under the approach path of the third runway but under the approach/departure path for runway 16R/34L, became Sydenham Green, a public park covering 4.5 hectares.  A series of oversized 'living room' sculptures (lamp, chairs and fireplace) decorate the park, paying homage to the homes that formerly occupied the site.

Sister cities
Marrickville Council had sister city relations with the following cities:

 Bethlehem, West Bank, since 2007
 Funchal, Madeira Islands, Portugal, since 1996
 Keelung, Taiwan, since 1989
 Kos, Greece, since 1990
 Larnaca, Cyprus, since 2005
 Safita, Syria, since 2005
 Zonnebeke, Belgium, since 2007

The following cities have also signed agreements to formalise relationships with Marrickville:
 6th of October City, Egypt

References

External links
 Marrickville Council

1861 establishments in Australia
Former local government areas in Sydney
Articles containing video clips
2016 disestablishments in Australia
Inner West
 
Lists of local government leaders of places in New South Wales
Marrickville, New South Wales